The  Washington Redskins season was the franchise's 16th season in the National Football League (NFL) and their 10th in Washington, D.C.  The team failed to improve on their 5–5–1 record from 1946 and finished 4–8.

Before the season

NFL Draft

Schedule

Standings

References

Washington
Washington Redskins seasons
Washington